This is a list of the top newspapers in India by circulation. These figures include both print and digital subscriptions, are compiled by the Audit Bureau of Circulations. The figures include normal print editions, branded print editions (e.g., regional editions or editions tailored for commuters), and digital subscriptions (e.g., for tablet computers or restricted-access).

Circulation figures try to estimate the number of copies sold, while readership figures are usually higher as they tend to estimate the number of people who actually read the newspaper. Typically, readership tends to be 2.5 times circulation, though this may be higher or lower depending on individual cases.

List

See also

List of newspapers by circulation
List of newspapers in India by readership
List of newspapers in the United States 
List of newspapers in the United Kingdom
List of newspapers in Bangladesh by circulation

References

External links
 
 Details of language wise most circulated dailies for the audit period Jul – Dec 2018 by Audit Bureau of Circulations 
 Details of language wise most circulated dailies for the audit period Jan – Jun 2018 by Audit Bureau of Circulations 
 Audit Bureau of Circulation 

 

India
 
Circulation